Patricia Gavira Collado (born 26 April 1989) is a Spanish footballer who plays as a midfielder for Granadilla.

Club career
Patri Gavira started her career at Sevilla.

References

External links
Profile at La Liga

1989 births
Living people
Women's association football midfielders
Spanish women's footballers
Footballers from San Roque, Cádiz
Sevilla FC (women) players
Sporting de Huelva players
UD Granadilla Tenerife players
Primera División (women) players
21st-century Spanish women